The gens Betucia was a Roman family during the late Republic.  It is best known as a result of the orator, Titus Betucius Barrus, a native of Asculum in Picenum.  Cicero described him as the most eloquent of all orators outside of Rome.  He also delivered a famous speech at Rome against Quintus Servilius Caepio, who perished during the Social War.

See also
 List of Roman gentes

References

Roman gentes